Wojciech Antoni Waglewski (born 21 April 1953 in Nowy Sącz) is a Polish musician; singer, guitarist, composer, arranger and producer, a member of Polish Society of the Phonographic Industry and Polish Film Academy. He has played in bands such as Voo Voo, Morawski Waglewski Nowicki Hołdys, Osjan and Bemibem, and also performs as a solo artist. As of 2013, he has been nominated to twenty-three Fryderyk awards (Polish equivalent of Grammy) and won five times. In 2010 and 2011, he was the art director of concert tour Męskie Granie.

He is the son of Polish journalist Jerzy Waglewski. Wojciech is married to Grażyna, the couple has two sons (both are hip-hop musicians): Fisz (Bartosz, born 1978) and Emade (Piotr, born 1981).

Discography

Solo albums

Collaborative albums

Soundtracks

Awards and nominations

Fryderyk

|-
| 1994 || rowspan=5 |Wojciech Waglewski || Composer of the Year|| 
|-
| rowspan=2 | 1995 || Producer of the Year || 
|-
| Composer of the Year || 
|-
| rowspan=3 | 1998 || Producer of the Year || 
|- 
| Composer of the Year|| 
|-
| Muzyka od środka || Album of the Year – Alternative|| 
|-
| 2001 || rowspan=6 | Wojciech Waglewski || Composer of the Year|| 
|-
| rowspan=2 | 2006 || Best Music Production || 
|-
|  Composer of the Year || 
|-
| rowspan=5 | 2008 || Composer of the Year || 
|-
|  Writer of the Year || 
|-
|  Male Vocalist of the Year || 
|-
| Koledzy || Album of the Year – Pop || 
|-
| "Koledzy" || Video of the Year ||
|-
| rowspan=3 | 2009 || rowspan=2 | Wojciech Waglewski || Composer of the Year || 
|-
|  Writer of the Year || 
|- 
| Męska muzyka || Album of the Year – Alternative || 
|-
| rowspan=6 | 2011 || rowspan=2 | Wojciech Waglewski || Composer of the Year || 
|-
|  Writer of the Year || 
|- 
| Harmonia || Album of the Year – Folk/World Music || 
|- 
| Voo Voo || Group of the Year || 
|- 
| Wszyscy muzycy to wojownicy (Voo Voo) || Album of the Year – Rock || 
|-
| Męskie granie (with Smolik, Abradab, Maleńczuk, Mitch&Mitch, Pogodno, Fisz Emade, Kim Nowak, DJ Eprom, OXY.GEN, Voo Voo, Jacaszek) || Album of the Year – Alternative ||

References 

Polish male guitarists
Polish composers
Polish rock musicians
Polish rock singers
Polish folk singers
Polish jazz singers
1953 births
People from Nowy Sącz
Living people
Polish lyricists
20th-century Polish  male singers
21st-century Polish male singers
21st-century Polish singers
Male jazz musicians